Kornélia Ihász (10 June 1937 – 14 December 2022) was a Hungarian speed skater. She competed in three events at the 1964 Winter Olympics.

References

1937 births
2022 deaths
Hungarian female speed skaters
Olympic speed skaters of Hungary
Speed skaters at the 1964 Winter Olympics
Speed skaters from Budapest